Beatmania IIDX 18 Resort Anthem is a music video game in the Beatmania IIDX series of games by Konami. On April 19, 2010, Bemani fansite Zenius -I- Vanisher reported that Konami had announced the first location test for the newest game in the IIDX series. The location test ran from April 22 to April 26 at the Cat's Eye Machida (キャッツアイ町田) in Machida, Tokyo. Follow-up location tests ran in Chōfu, Tokyo and Kyoto from April 30 to May 6, in Nagoya and Sapporo from May 14 to May 20 and in Chiyoda, Tokyo from June 11 to June 12. The game was released on September 15, 2010 This Beatmania iteration's theme focuses heavily on a futuresque modern relaxation and tropical beach resort concert-like setting, with the interface making use of sleek mechanical components with simple whites and bright colors that are easy on the eyes.

Gameplay
Beatmania IIDX tasks the player with performing songs through a controller consisting of seven key buttons and a scratchable turntable. Hitting the notes with strong timing increases the score and groove gauge bar, allowing the player to finish the stage. Failing to do so depletes the gauge until it is empty, abruptly ending the song.

There are some changes made for this series. The song wheel is now circular rather than vertical, similar to the one in Dance Dance Revolution. 2 new modes are presented; Premium Free Mode, a mode where the player plays for 8 minutes as opposed to 2 stages, and DJ Order Mode, a mode which is similar to Pop'n Musics Challenge Mode, where a player can select missions (similar to pop'ns Normas) and earn DELLAR POINTS. Other than that, all of the gameplay remains the same.

Unlocking System
Resort Anthem only has one Extra Stage, making it the first to do this since Beatmania IIDX 12: Happy Sky. However, players can get new songs through Beat Unlocks, JAPAN TOUR, WORLD TOUR and other unlockable events.

Append festival
With the announcement of APPEND FESTIVAL, a new crossover from jubeat series was unlocked on March 11, 2011 and another crossover from jubeat knit APPEND was unlocked on March 23, 2011. This unlocking system needs an e-Amusement card.

Lincle LINK
KONAMI announced the Lincle LINK event on June 30, 2011. This event would start in the middle of July, linking Resort Anthem and REFLEC BEAT together through song unlocking. Again, this event needed an e-Amusement card.

Music
Beatmania IIDX 18 Resort Anthem feature 74 new songs as well as 567 songs from previous releases for a total of 641 songs. A total of 21 songs had been removed from this game.

References

External links
beatmaniaIIDX18 Resort Anthem location test information 
beatmaniaIIDX18 Resort Anthem discussion thread at Zenius -I- Vanisher
RemyWiki

2010 video games
Arcade video games
Arcade-only video games
Beatmania games
Video games developed in Japan
Video games scored by Kosuke Saito
Japan-exclusive video games
Multiplayer and single-player video games